Matts Dumell (born 1952) is a Swedish-speaking Finn journalist with a long career in TV-production and documentary film making in public service.
He has been employed by Hufvudstadsbladet over several periods of time and he was one of the founders of the radio channel Radio Ykkönen.
Dumell has also published several books.

Dumell was working at YLE when he was convicted of allegedly spying for the Soviet Union. He was arrested by the Finnish Security Police. He received an eight-month prison sentence for treason in 1983.

Television 

  (Nelonen, ed.)
  (Finnish: , Yle FST5 2006, ed.)
  (Finnish:  Yle FST5 2007, ed.)
  (Yle TV1 2007, ed.)
  (Yle TV1 2007, ed.)
  (Finnish: , Yle FST5 2007, ed.)

Published works

, Schildts 2007, Finnish: , Schildts 2008
 & Jorma Melleri, Gummerus 1992
 , Kustannusvaihe 1983
 , 1975

References

Living people
1952 births
20th-century Finnish criminals
Finnish male criminals
Finnish journalists
Swedish-speaking Finns
Finnish spies for the Soviet Union
People convicted of spying for the Soviet Union
1983 in international relations